Voice of San Diego is a nonprofit news organization focused on issues affecting the San Diego region.

Background
Voice of San Diego is an online-only local news site. Established in 2005, it was one of a number of such publications that emerged around that time in response to layoffs at traditional local print newspapers. The site is known for both its news coverage and local investigative reporting. The website is partially funded by grants, but is financed primarily on a nonprofit membership model.

The News Revenue Hub, which helps other nonprofits adopt membership features, started as a project of Voice of San Diego in 2016. In 2017 it was spun off as an independent organization.

Recognition
Voice of San Diego has won a variety of local journalism awards from the San Diego chapter of the Society of Professional Journalists for investigations exposing corruption at the San Diego Unified School District and from the San Diego Press Club.

References

External links
 

American news websites
Newspapers published in San Diego
Daily newspapers published in California
Companies based in San Diego
Nonprofit newspapers